Frank Peter Zimmermann (born 27 February 1965) is a German violinist.

Childhood
He was born in Duisburg, West Germany, and started playing the violin when he was five years old, giving his first concert with orchestra at the age of 10.

Since he finished his studies with Valery Valentinovich Gradow, Saschko Gawriloff, and Herman Krebbers in 1983, Frank Peter Zimmermann has been performing with a considerable number of major orchestras and conductors in the world.

Highlights
Highlights include engagements with, among others, the Boston Symphony Orchestra and Paavo Berglund, the National Symphony Orchestra Washington and Leonard Slatkin, the Chicago Symphony Orchestra and Manfred Honeck, the Berlin Philharmonic Orchestra and Bernard Haitink, the Philharmonia Orchestra and Wolfgang Sawallisch and the Bavarian Radio Symphony Orchestra and Mariss Jansons.

In February 2003, Frank Peter Zimmermann and the Berlin Philharmonic Orchestra conducted by Peter Eötvös gave the world premiere of the violin concerto ‘en sourdine' by the German composer Matthias Pintscher.

Recitals
Apart from engagements with orchestra, Frank Peter Zimmermann also gives recitals. Since 1998 his regular partner is Italian pianist Enrico Pace. Other regular chamber music partners are Heinrich Schiff, Piotr Anderszewski and Christian Zacharias. His recording of the Brahms Double Concerto with Schiff won the Deutscher Schallplattenpreis.

Stradivarius
From 2001 to 2015, Zimmermann played a 1711 Stradivarius violin known as the "Lady Inchiquin", previously played by Fritz Kreisler. The violin had been loaned to Zimmermann by Düsseldorf-based bank WestLB AG, but was reclaimed in February 2015 at the termination of the loan contract by the bank's legal successor, Portigon Financial Services, owing to the bank's bankruptcy.

In January 2016 Zimmermann was loaned the 1727 "Général Dupont" Stradivarius for an initial period of two years.  Also known as the "Grumiaux" Stradivarius, it had been owned by the celebrated Belgian virtuoso Arthur Grumiaux.  The instrument is owned by entrepreneur, philanthropist and amateur violinist Mr Yu, who purchased it in February 2015 through Rare Violins of New York for an undisclosed sum – making the violin the first Stradivarius to be owned by a private individual on the Chinese mainland.

In early 2017, Zimmerman was reunited with his Lady Inchiquin.

References

External links 
 

German classical violinists
Male classical violinists
German male violinists
1965 births
Living people
EMI Classics and Virgin Classics artists
Conservatorium van Amsterdam alumni
Officers Crosses of the Order of Merit of the Federal Republic of Germany
21st-century classical violinists
21st-century male musicians